Tham Non is a cave to the north of Vang Vieng, Laos. It is located in close proximity to the Nam Song River.

References

Caves of Laos
Geography of Vientiane province